Heritage Lake may refer to:

Heritage Lake, Illinois
Heritage Lake, Indiana